Dysomma dolichosomatum is an eel in the family Synaphobranchidae (cutthroat eels). It was described by Christine Karrer in 1983. It is a tropical, marine eel which is known from the Indo-Pacific. It dwells at a depth range of 550–555 metres.

References

Synaphobranchidae
Taxa named by Christine Karrer
Fish described in 1983